Giuseppe "Joe" Paladino (born 29 August 1965) is an English football coach and former professional player. He is currently the Goalkeeping Coach of New Mills.

Paladino also enjoyed a career as a professional boxer.

Football career

Playing career
Paladino, who played as a goalkeeper, started his career in non-league football with Rossendale United and St Helens Town. He signed for Wigan Athletic in December 1990, making seven appearances in the Football League for the team during the 1990–91 season. He returned to non-league football the following season with Runcorn, and went on to play for Witton Albion, where he was part of the squad that reached the final of the FA Trophy, and Altrincham.

Coaching career
Paladino took charge of Daisy Hill in February 2002.

Paladino later took charge of St Helens Town in January 2004, before quitting in March 2005.

After working as a goalkeeping coach at FC United of Manchester, he was appointed Assistant Manager of Rossendale United in March 2010. He was manager of Congleton Town in 2011.

Boxing career
Paladino was also a professional boxer. He retired in 1997 before returning as an amateur in 2006.

References

External links
 

Living people
English footballers
English football managers
Rossendale United F.C. players
St Helens Town A.F.C. players
Wigan Athletic F.C. players
Runcorn F.C. Halton players
Witton Albion F.C. players
Altrincham F.C. players
Daisy Hill F.C. managers
St Helens Town A.F.C. managers
Congleton Town F.C. managers
English Football League players
English people of Italian descent
English male boxers
1965 births
Association football goalkeepers